Mayorovsky is a rural locality (a khutor) in Kachalinskoye Rural Settlement, Surovikinsky District, Volgograd Oblast, Russia. The population was 452 as of 2010. There are 7 streets.

Geography 
Mayorovsky is located on the Bystry Erik River, 57 km northeast of Surovikino (the district's administrative centre) by road. Sukhanovsky is the nearest rural locality.

References 

Rural localities in Surovikinsky District